Carlotta Walls LaNier (born December 18, 1942) is the youngest of the Little Rock Nine, a group of African-American students who, in 1957, were the first black students ever to attend classes at Little Rock Central High School in Little Rock, Arkansas, United States. She was the first black female to graduate from Central High School. In 1999, LaNier and the rest of the Little Rock Nine were awarded the Congressional Gold Medal by President Bill Clinton. LaNier was inducted into the Colorado Women's Hall of Fame in 2004 and the National Women's Hall of Fame in 2015.

Early and personal life
Carlotta Walls LaNier was born on December 18, 1942, in Little Rock, Arkansas to Juanita and Cartelyou Walls. Cartelyou was a brick mason and a World War II veteran, while Juanita was a secretary in the Office of Public Housing. Cartelyou died in 1976 from leukemia. LaNier was the eldest of three girls. She was inspired by Rosa Parks when she refused to give up her seat in the 1955 Montgomery bus boycott.

LaNier first attended Dunbar Junior High School, a segregated school in Little Rock. However, after graduating, she volunteered to be one of the first African-Americans to attend Central High School. She married Ira (Ike) LaNier in 1968 with whom she had two children, Whitney and Brooke. She has two grandchildren, a granddaughter and a grandson. She currently resides in Englewood, Colorado.

LaNier learned about the chance to go to Central High School by her homeroom teacher at her junior high. Her teacher asked if anyone was interested in going to Central, and LaNier popped out of her seat and registered to go to the new school. Her parents didn’t know she had been enrolled until the registration card showed up in the mail that July.

On February 9, 1960, LaNier's home was bombed. Two sticks of dynamite were placed on her home. The explosion removed bricks, destroyed three windows, and could be heard from two miles away. Her father was away, but LaNier was home alongside her mother and sisters. Nobody was harmed in the bombing, but it was the first bombing directed at one of the students. Despite the bombing, LaNier continued to attend the school.

Desegregation

On September 4, 1957, the Little Rock Nine made an unsuccessful attempt to enter Central High School, which had been segregated. The Arkansas National Guard, under orders from the governor, and an angry mob of about 400 surrounded the school and prevented them from going in. On September 23, 1957, a mob of about 1000 people surrounded the school again as the students attempted to enter. The following day, President Dwight D. Eisenhower took control of the Arkansas National Guard from the governor and sent soldiers to accompany the students to school for protection. Soldiers were deployed at the school for the entirety of the school year, although they were unable to prevent incidents of violence against the group inside.

Despite the constant torment from the white students, Lanier never cried or retaliated. She remained strong through all the times she was called names, spat on, and knocked over. She knew she had to be there as an example student so that all schools could eventually be desegregated. During her time there, LaNier was an honor roll student.

In 1958, LaNier and the rest of the Little Rock Nine were awarded the Spingarn Medal by the National Association for the Advancement of Colored People (NAACP), as was Daisy Bates. The crisis resulted in all of Little Rock's high schools being closed during that year. Despite this, LaNier returned to Central High in 1959 and graduated in 1960.

College and career
Following her graduation from Central High in 1960, LaNier attended Michigan State University for two years. However, her father was unable to find a job because of the crisis surrounding his daughter, and they moved to Denver, Colorado. LaNier graduated from Colorado State College (now the University of Northern Colorado) and began working at the YWCA as a program administrator for teens.  In 1977, she founded LaNier and Company, a real estate brokerage company. 

For over 30 years, LaNier has worked as a professional real estate broker. She is currently working with Brokers Guild-Cherry Creek Ltd., and formerly worked with Prudential Colorado Real Estate. She is a member of Metrolist, Inc.

LaNier has been a member of the Colorado Aids Project, Jack and Jill of America, The Urban League, and the NAACP. She was also  the president of the Little Rock Nine Foundation, an organization dedicated to ensuring equal access to education for African American students.

Writings
A Mighty Long Way: My Journey to Justice at Little Rock Central High School. With Lisa Frazier Page. OneWorld/Ballantine, 2009, .

References

External links

 Carlotta Walls LaNier at America.gov
 Carlotta LaNier entry at the Colorado Women's Hall of Fame
 "Changing Minds: The Youngest of the Little Rock Nine Talks Justice" --an August 2009 interview with Carlotta Walls LaNier from Books on the Root
 A Mighty Long Way book review at The Huffington Post
 Little Rock Nine Foundation website
 
 http://www.encyclopediaofarkansas.net/entries/carlotta-walls-lanier-729/
 https://www.thehistorymakers.org/biography/carlotta-walls-lanier-39

1942 births
American civil rights activists
Women civil rights activists
Michigan State University alumni
Living people
Little Rock Nine
Spingarn Medal winners
Congressional Gold Medal recipients